Sir Alfred George Lascelles KC (12 October 1857 – 9 February 1952) was the 20th Chief Justice of Ceylon. He was appointed on 1 May 1911 succeeding Joseph Turner Hutchinson and was Chief Justice until 1914. He was succeeded by Alexander Wood Renton.

Alfred George Lascelles was the son of Hon. George Edwin Lascelles (a son of the 3rd Earl of Harewood) and his wife Lady Louisa Nina Murray (daughter of the 4th Earl of Mansfield), and was born at Moor Hill, Harewood on 12 October 1857. He graduated from University College, Oxford, with a Bachelor of Arts and was admitted to Inner Temple in 1885 entitled to practice as a barrister.

Lascelles served as Crown Advocate of Cyprus from 1898 until 1902. In May 1902 he was appointed Attorney General of Ceylon, in which he acted as Chief Justice of Ceylon from 12 March to 31 October 1906. He was Chief Justice of Ceylon from 1911 to 1914.

On 26 October 1911 he married Isabel Carteret Thynne. He died at Terrington on 9 February 1952 at age 94. Lascelles had three daughters and a son, his son Wing Commander Francis Alfred George Lascelles DFC died in 1941 serving with the Royal Air Force.

References

Chief Justices of British Ceylon
Acting Chief Justices of Ceylon
19th-century Sri Lankan people
20th-century Sri Lankan people
Sri Lankan people of British descent
19th-century British people
Attorneys General of British Ceylon
People from British Ceylon
Knights Bachelor
1857 births
1952 deaths